Duet! is a duo album by pianists Earl Hines and Jaki Byard recorded in 1972 and released on the German MPS label. Hines and Byard perform solo on one track each.

Reception
The AllMusic review by Ken Dryden stated the album was "most successful... because of the common ground they shared".

Track listing 
All compositions by Jaki Byard, except as indicated
 "A Toodle Oo, Toodle Oo" - 5:52   
 "This Is Always" (Mack Gordon, Harry Warren) - 3:26   
 "Rosetta" (Earl Hines, Henri Woode) - 4:48   
 "I Can't Trust Myself Alone" (Hines) - 5:12   
 "Sweet Georgia Brown" (Ben Bernie, Maceo Pinkard, Kenneth Casey) - 2:51   
 "As Long as I Live" (Harold Arlen, Ted Koehler) - 5:48   
 "Genoa to Pescara" - 6:15   
 "La Rosita" (Allan Stuart, Paul Dupont) - 4:18

Personnel 
Jaki Byard (tracks 1-3 & 5-8), Earl Hines (tracks 1-6 & 8)piano

References 

1972 albums
Earl Hines albums
Jaki Byard albums
MPS Records albums
Albums produced by Don Schlitten